The Meeting Sport Solidarietà is an annual track and field meet that takes place at Guido Teghil Stadium in Lignano Sabbiadoro, Italy. It was first held in July 1990.

Meeting records

Men

Women

References

External links
Official website
Meeting records

European Athletic Association meetings
Recurring sporting events established in 1990
1990 establishments in Italy